Young Mr. Jazz is a 1919 American short comedy film featuring Harold Lloyd. A print of the film survives in the film archive of the Museum of Modern Art.

Plot
Bebe is escorted to a beach by her father.  The moment the father walks away from Bebe, Harold approaches her.  The father returns and proceeds to violently dissuade Harold's amorous intentions.  By tunneling through the sand, Harold manages to speak to Bebe briefly and arranges to take her dancing that night.  Shortly after Harold picks her up for their date in his automobile, Bebe's father sees them and angrily follows the couple in his car.  Harold and Bebe try to elude him by going into a seedy establishment called the Bowery Cafe.  Within a short time both Harold and Bebe have had their money and valuables stolen by a team of pickpockets.  Harold realizes his money is gone only when his waiter tries to collect the bill for Harold and Bebe's drinks.  The couple dances to avoid a confrontation with the waiter. Eventually Bebe's father enters the cafe and he too is robbed.  A large fight ensues in which Harold acrobatically knocks out all the ruffians in the cafe.  This action puts Harold in the good graces of Bebe's father.

Cast
 Harold Lloyd as The Boy
 Snub Pollard
 Bebe Daniels
 Sammy Brooks
 Billy Fay
 Mildred Forbes
 Rose Gold
 Lew Harvey
 Wallace Howe
 Bud Jamison
 Margaret Joslin
 Dee Lampton
 Marie Mosquini
 Fred C. Newmeyer
 James Parrott
 Dorothea Wolbert
 Noah Young

See also
 Harold Lloyd filmography

References

External links

1919 films
1919 short films
American silent short films
1919 comedy films
American black-and-white films
Films directed by Hal Roach
Silent American comedy films
American comedy short films
1910s American films
1910s English-language films